The Finnish diaspora consists of Finnish emigrants and their descendants, especially those that maintain some of the customs of their Finnish culture. Finns emigrated to the United Kingdom, the United States, France, Canada, Australia, Argentina, New Zealand, Sweden, Norway, Russia, Germany, Israel and Brazil.

The Great Migration

The years between 1870 and 1930 are sometimes referred as 'the Great Migration' of Finns into North America. In the 1870s, there were only 3,000 migrants from Finland, but this figure was rapidly growing. New migrants often sent letters home, describing their life in the New World, and this encouraged more and more people to leave and try their luck in America. Rumors began of the acres of land that could be cleared into vast productive fields and the opportunity to earn "a barrel of American dollars" in mines, factories, and railroads. There were also professional recruiters, or 'agents', employed by mining and shipping companies, who encouraged Finns to move to the United States. This activity was frowned upon by the authorities of the Grand Duchy, and was mostly done in secret. It was eventually brought to an end in the late 1880s by legislation in the United States, but the decade still saw a 12-fold increase in the number of Finnish migrants compared to the previous decade, as 36,000 Finns left their home country for North America.

Gallery

References